Còig is a Canadian folk music group from Cape Breton Island, Nova Scotia. The group consists of Darren McMullen on guitar, mandolin, mandola, banjo, bouzouki, whistles, flute and vocals; Rachel Davis on fiddle, viola and vocals; Jason Roach on piano and Chrissy Crowley on fiddle and viola.

History
Còig was formed in 2010 to perform at the Celtic Colours festival. The band, which at that time included fiddler Colin Grant, released its debut album Five in 2014. The album, which included new arrangements and instrumentation of traditional music, won the award for Traditional Album of the Year at the 10th Canadian Folk Music Awards. They followed up in 2015 with Carols, an album of Christmas music.

Còig released the album Rove in 2017. It received nominations for Traditional Album of the Year at the 13th Canadian Folk Music Awards and Traditional Roots Album of the Year at the Juno Awards of 2018. That year the band performed at the East Coast Music Awards ceremony. Also that year, fiddler Colin Grant left the group.

In 2017, and again in 2018, the band once again performed at the Celtic Colours Festival. In 2018, the band was named Roots/traditional recording of the year at the East Coast Music Awards.

References

External links

Canadian folk music groups
Musical groups from Nova Scotia
Musical groups established in 2010
Canadian Folk Music Award winners
2010 establishments in Nova Scotia